Bobby Brown III (born August 7, 2000) is an American football nose tackle for the Los Angeles Rams of the National Football League (NFL). He played college football at Texas A&M.

College career
He played college football at Texas A&M from 2018 to 2020. He ranked seventh in the SEC with 5.5 sacks in the 2020 season.

Professional career

Brown was drafted by the Los Angeles Rams in the fourth round, 117th overall, of the 2021 NFL Draft. He signed his four-year rookie contract with the Rams on June 3, 2021. Brown ended his rookie season with a Rams Super Bowl LVI victory against the Cincinnati Bengals.

Brown was suspended the first six games of the 2022 season for violating the NFL’s policy on performance-enhancing substances. In the 2022 season, he appeared in nine games and started one. He finished with eight total tackles.

References

External links
 Los Angeles Rams bio
 Texas A&M Aggies bio

2000 births
Living people
American football defensive tackles
Los Angeles Rams players
Players of American football from Texas
Sportspeople from Arlington, Texas
Texas A&M Aggies football players